Nacella concinna is a species of sea snail, a true limpet, a marine gastropod mollusk in the family Nacellidae, one of the families of true limpets.

Description
It is an elongated ovate, moderately elevated cone with a low apex somewhat towards the anterior margin and angled in that direction. There are about 30 faint radial ribs and a series of fine concentric lines that indicate the annual growth rings. The exterior of the shell is varying shades of pale brown and grey and the interior is dark purplish-brown in deep water specimens but creamy-brown in those from shallow water. The mantle has a fringe of short tentacles.

Distribution
Nacella concinna is found on the seabed of the Scotia Sea between Tierra del Fuego and the Antarctic Peninsula. The range includes South Georgia, the South Orkneys, the South Shetlands, Bouvet Island, Seymour Island, Paulet Island, Wandel Island, Anvers Island and Petermann Island. The depth range varies from the inter-tidal zone down to  though most specimens come from shallow waters a few metres deep.

Biology
Nacella concinna moves around on rocks and soft substrates feeding on algae and diatoms. It is gonochoristic, individuals being either male or female, and fertilisation is external. The larval development has been little studied. Spawning takes place in the spring algal bloom period. Mature adults often synchronise their spawning, forming spawning towers or groups of up to 35 individuals which may persist for a week or more. These structures are considered likely to improve fertilisation rates as sperm flows have been observed to cascade down the towers in calm water situations. Even in moving water, sperm concentrations are higher and fertilisation is more likely to occur.

References

 Engl W. (2012) Shells of Antarctica. Hackenheim: Conchbooks. 402 pp

External links
 Strebel, H. (1908). Die Gastropoden. In: Wissenschaftliche Ergebnisse der Schwedischen Südpolar-Expedition 1901–1903 unter Leitung von Dr. Otto Nordenskjöld, Bd 6, Lief. 1: 111 pp., 6 pls. Stockholm
 Hedley, C. (1916) Mollusca. Scientific Reports of the Australasian Antarctic Expedition, 1911–1914. Under the Leadership of Sir Douglas Mawson, D. Sc., B. E., Scientific Results Series C.-Zoology and Botany, 4, 1–80, 9 pls.
 Hombron J.B. & Jacquinot C.H. (1841). Description de quelques mollusques provenant de la campagne de l'Astrolabe et de la Zélée. Annales des Sciences Naturelles. ser. 2, Zoologie, 16: 62-65, 190-192
 González-Wevar C.A., Hüne M., Rosenfeld S., Nakano T., Saucède T., Spencer H. & Poulin E. (2018). Systematic revision of Nacella (Patellogastropoda: Nacellidae) based on a complete phylogeny of the genus, with the description of a new species from the southern tip of South America. Zoological Journal of the Linnean Society. DOI: 10.1093/zoolinnean/zly067
  Powell, A. W. B. (1973). The patellid limpets of the world (Patellidae). Indo-Pacific Mollusca. 3(15): 75-206

Nacellidae
Gastropods described in 1908